Hala Olivia is an arena in Gdańsk, Poland. It was designed by Maciej Gintowt and  Maciej Krasinski.  Building was started on 1965, and it opened on December 16, 1972. It is primarily used for ice hockey and is the home of Stoczniowiec Gdansk. The basketball club Prokom Gdynia also used the facility for home Euroleague fixtures. Hala Olivia opened in 1970 and holds 5,500 people. In September 1981, the first Congress of the Solidarity was held here. 865 delegate attended the sessions. The buildings exterior was completely renovated in 2016.   Renovations on the interior are ongoing. This is one of the few remaining sports arenas left of this particular socialist modernism style otherwise called Brutalism. Two other examples of this design style are the closed Vilnius Palace of Concerts and Sports in Vilnius Lithuania, and the now destroyed Volgar Sports Palace in Tolyatti, Russia.

The arena hosted a preliminary round group of the EuroBasket 2009. It is located near the Oliwa campus of the University of Gdańsk.

Notes

Indoor arenas in Poland
Indoor ice hockey venues in Poland
Sport in Gdańsk
Buildings and structures in Gdańsk
Basketball venues in Poland
Sports venues in Pomeranian Voivodeship